California was an American monthly magazine, published from 1978 to 1991, which focused on the state of California.

It was founded as New West magazine in 1978 by  Clay Felker, founder of New York Magazine. It featured writers such as Tom Wolfe, Joan Didion and Joe Eszterhas. It was purchased by Rupert Murdoch in 1977. In 1980, it was sold to Mediatex Communications Corp., which published Texas Monthly. Mediatex changed the name of the magazine to California.

For 15 years, the magazine was a purveyor of "new journalism". The magazine first exposed Jim Jones' People's Temple. Jones left the same night that an editor at New West magazine read him an article to be published by Marshall Kilduff detailing allegations of abuse by former Temple members.

The magazine exposed defects in Firestone tires and issues with the sleeping pill Halcion.
A California May 1983 article "Top Guns", written by Ehud Yonay, inspired the movie Top Gun.

The magazine's circulation peaked at about 360,000 in 1987. By 1991, circulation had dropped to 250,000 and it was shut down along with sister publication SF.

References

Defunct magazines published in the United States
Local interest magazines published in the United States
Magazines established in 1978
Magazines disestablished in 1991
Magazines published in California